Life Changes may refer to:

Albums
Life Changes (Sash! album), 2013
Life Changes (Thomas Rhett album), 2017

Songs
"Life Changes" (2013), by Sash! from Life Changes
"Life Changes" (2016), by Good Charlotte from Youth Authority
"Life Changes" (Thomas Rhett song), from Life Changes